Live Facelift is a concert video and live album by the American rock band Alice in Chains, originally released on VHS on July 30, 1991, containing live footage of songs from their debut album, Facelift, recorded at The Moore Theatre in Seattle on December 22, 1990. The video has been certified gold by the RIAA with excess sales of 50,000 copies.

Live Facelift was released on vinyl for the first time on November 25, 2016, as part of Record Store Day's Black Friday event. Only 5000 copies were issued. On September 15, 2017, the concert was released on red vinyl on a limited edition of only 1000 copies, each coming with a special commemorative poster.

Song list

VHS

 "Man in the Box" (Jerry Cantrell, Layne Staley)
 "Real Thing" (Cantrell, Staley)
 "Love, Hate, Love" (Cantrell, Staley, Mike Starr, Sean Kinney)
 "Sea of Sorrow" (Cantrell)
 "Bleed the Freak" (Cantrell)
 "We Die Young" (videoclip) (Cantrell)
 "Man in the Box" (videoclip) (Cantrell, Staley) 
 "Sea of Sorrow" (videoclip) (Cantrell)

Vinyl
Side A
 "It Ain't Like That" (Cantrell, Starr, Kinney)
 "Man in the Box" (Cantrell, Staley)
 "Real Thing" (Cantrell, Staley)

Side B
 "Love, Hate, Love" (Cantrell, Staley, Starr, Kinney)
 "Sea of Sorrow" (Cantrell)
 "Bleed the Freak" (Cantrell)

Certifications

Personnel
Layne Staley – lead vocals 
Jerry Cantrell – lead guitar, vocals
Mike Starr – bass
Sean Kinney – drums

References

External links

Alice in Chains video albums
American documentary films
1990s English-language films
1991 video albums
1991 live albums
2016 live albums
Albums recorded at the Moore Theatre